The Kozlov Nunataks are a group of nunataks lying  north of Mount Parviainen in the Tula Mountains of Enderby Land, Antarctica. The nunataks were visited by geologists of the Soviet Antarctic Expedition, 1961–62, who named them for M.I. Kozlov, a Soviet polar pilot.

References

Nunataks of Enderby Land